Vetrivel Sakthivel is a 2005 Indian Tamil-language action comedy film written and directed by Lakshmi Priyan and produced by R. S. Venkatraman. It stars Sathyaraj and his son Sibiraj alongside Khushbu Sundar and Nikita Thukral while Vadivelu and Bharathi play supporting roles and Thambi Ramaiah play the antongonist roles. The music was composed by Srikanth Deva, while editing was dole by K. Palanivel. The film released on 9 December 2005.

Plot
Vetrivel (Sathyaraj) is a businessman who lives with his wife Kamatchi (Khushbu Sundar), son Sakthivel (Sibiraj), daughter Selvi (Bharathi), and brother-in-law (Kamatchi's brother) Thandapani (Vadivelu). Sakthi wanted to become as an IPS officer, but his father denied it and made him work in his shop. Selvi gets married and lives happily, while Sakthi falls in love with Manju (Nikita Thukral). It turns out that Manju is the daughter of Vetri's sister, who eloped with someone. Since Vetri has lost touch with his sister, Manju came into their lives to reunite the siblings. Meanwhile, Selvi finds out that her husband, father-in-law (Thambi Ramaiah), and the latter's wife are culprits and smugglers. Before she can tell someone about it, she is killed, and her child is kept. Sakthi goes to visit his sister and finds her dead. Sakthi takes vengeance on his sister's murderers and goes to jail, while Manju's mother reunites with her brother Vetri. After having served his jail sentence, Sakthi marries Manju and lives happily ever after.

Cast
Sathyaraj as Vetrivel
Sibiraj as Sakthivel
Khushbu Sundar as Kamatchi
Nikita as Manju
Vadivelu as Thandapani
Bharathi as Selvi
Thambi Ramaiah as Selvi's father-in-law
T. P. Gajendran as Marriage broker
Singamuthu as Buyer
Poovilangu Mohan as Manju's father
Halwa Vasu as Auto driver
Bonda Mani as Seller
Nellai Siva as Villager
Jaguar Thangam as Villager

Production
During production, the film was briefly titled as Vel Vel and then as Vel Vel Brothers, before being named Vetrivel Sakthivel after the lead characters.

Soundtrack
Soundtrack was composed by Srikanth Deva.

Release
Sify called the film "nepotism of the worst kind", going to add that "director Lakshmi Priyan has dished out one of the most inept movies of the year".

References

2005 films
2000s Tamil-language films
Films scored by Srikanth Deva